

Events 
 The "Concert des Amateurs" is founded by François-Joseph Gossec.
 Ballet is performed the first time in Oslo by Madame Stuart.
Musikalisches Vielerley is published; a collection of pieces from various composers, edited by CPE Bach. (Hamburg: Michael Christian Bock)

Classical music 
Carl Philipp Emanuel Bach – Fantasia in D minor, H.224
Johann Christian Bach 
6 Keyboard Concertos, Op. 7
6 Quartets, Op. 8
Luigi Boccherini – Cello Concerto in D major, G.479
Joseph Haydn – Baryton Trio in A major, Hob.XI:2
Gabriele Leone – Six sonatas for mandolin and bass marked with signs according to the new method, Op. 2
Wolfgang Amadeus Mozart – Symphony 11
Pietro Nardini – Sonatas for 2 Flutes/Violins and Basso Continuo

Methods and theory writings 

 Johann Caspar Heck – The Art of Playing the Harpsichord
 John Holden – An Essay Towards a Rational System of Music

Operas 
Christoph Willibald Gluck – Paride ed Elena, Wq.39

Published popular music 
William Billings – The New England Psalm Singer, featuring the song Chester.

Births 
February 18 – Christian Heinrich Rinck, composer (died 1846)
February 20 – Ferdinando Carulli, composer  (died 1841)
February 22 – Jan Matyas Nepomuk August Vitasek, composer (died 1839)
February 26 – Antoine Reicha, composer (died 1836)
May 19 – Antoine-Charles Glachant, violinist and composer (died 1851)
June 4 – James Hewitt, composer (died 1827)
November 8 – Friedrich Witt, composer (died 1836)
November 29 – Peter Hänsel, composer
December 13 – John Clarke-Whitfeld, composer (died 1836)
December 15 or December 16 (baptized on December 17) – Ludwig van Beethoven, composer and pianist (died 1827)
December 17 – Johann Friedrich Schubert, composer

Deaths 
February 26 – Giuseppe Tartini, violinist and composer, 77
April 19 – Esprit Antoine Blanchard, composer, 74
May 9 – Charles Avison, composer, 61
October 1 – Louis-Gabriel Guillemain, composer, 64
December 9 – Gottlieb Muffat, organist and composer, 80
December 13 – Johann Heinrich Hartmann Bätz, organ-builder, 61

References

 
18th century in music
Music by year